A snow angel is a simple depression in snow in the shape of an angel.

Snow Angel(s) may also refer to:

 Snow Angel (album), an album by Värttinä
 Snow Angels (album), an album Over the Rhine
 Snow Angel (play), a play by David Lindsay-Abaire
 Snow Angels (novel), a novel by Stewart O'Nan
 Snow Angels (film), a 2007 film based on O'Nan's novel
 Snow Angel, a novel by Thom Racina
 "Snow Angel", a song by Kotoko
 "Snow Angel", a song by Braids, from the album Shadow_Offering
 The Snow Angel, a 2017 children's book by Lauren St John
 Celestial Snow Angel - an emission nebula and a star formation region in the constellation Cygnus.